New York City Audubon is an American non-profit environmental organization incorporated in 1979. The group's mission reads in part: “New York City Audubon is a grassroots community that works for the protection of wild birds and habitat in the five boroughs, improving the quality of life for all New Yorkers.” With nearly 10,000 members, it is one of the largest organizations in the Audubon movement. It is named in honor of John James Audubon, an ornithologist and naturalist who shot, painted, catalogued, and described the Birds of North America.

In recent years, New York City Audubon has exercised particular influence in two areas: the restoration of the red-tailed hawk Pale Male's nest and the fatal effects of light pollution and glass windows on migratory birds.

Pale Male
New York City Audubon organized the protests that followed the removal of the hawk Pale Male’s nest in December, 2004 and played a major role in negotiating a solution with the co-op board of 927 Fifth Avenue. Although Pale Male and his mate, Lola, continued to nest at the site. No new chicks fledged in subsequent years. In 2008, NYC Audubon recruited experts from around the country to assess the problem, and removed pigeon spikes from the nest structure as a result of their recommendations. In 2011, Pale Male, with a new mate, successfully fledged two chicks, suggesting that fertility issues were the likely cause of the nest failure from 2005–2010.

Project Safe Flight
Each year, tens of thousands of birds are killed in North America by flying into windows. In 1997 New York City Audubon launched Project Safe Flight, modeled after Toronto’s Fatal Light Awareness Program (FLAP), to work toward long-term solutions for the bird collision problem. From the program's inception through 2013, field volunteers have found more than 6,000 dead or injured birds of more than 100 species. The most frequently harmed species include white-throated sparrows, common yellowthroats, and ovenbirds. Project Safe Flight works with building owners and managers to address site-specific threats to migratory birds and is working with politicians, architects, glass manufacturers and others to seek long-term solutions. Prior to 9/11, World Trade Center management, at New York City Audubon's request, placed protective netting around the lower floors of 1 WTC and 2 WTC. The netting acted somewhat like a trampoline — instead of striking the glass, the birds just bounced off, unharmed.

In September, 2006, Project Safe Flight began a comprehensive study aimed at quantifying the magnitude of the bird collision problem in New York City as well as identifying the main factors involved in such collisions. Dr. Daniel Klem of Muhlenberg College, an international authority on the bird collision topic, is leading the study. The project, funded by a grant from US Fish and Wildlife Service with matching funds from corporations and individuals, relies on local citizen scientists to monitor nearly 80 sites in Manhattan over the course of two migration seasons. Over 20 volunteers are involved in the monitoring effort

Lights Out New York
Light pollution contributes to bird collisions. In 2005 New York City Mayor Michael Bloomberg’s administration endorsed a voluntary New York City Audubon program that encourages tall buildings to turn out external lights between midnight and 6 AM and shield interior lights as well. The Chrysler Building, Bank of America Tower, and New York Times Building are among the nearly 100 buildings participating in the program.

Harbor Herons Project
Unknown to most, even to many birdwatchers, the small islands of the highly commercialized and heavily developed New York/New Jersey Estuary are home to one of the Atlantic Coast's largest colonies of nesting herons – with more than 3,000 individuals. Since 1985, New York City Audubon has managed the nesting sites.

See also
Geography and environment of New York City
Environmental issues in New York City
Jamaica Bay
Central Park
Prospect Park
Pelham Bay Park
Forest Park
Staten Island Greenbelt

References

External links
New York City Audubon Web site

1979 establishments in New York City
Audubon movement
Ornithological organizations in the United States
Environment of New York City
Organizations established in 1979
Environmental organizations based in New York City